The 19th Empire Awards ceremony (officially known as the Jameson Empire Awards), presented by the British film magazine Empire, honored the best films of 2013 and took place on 30 March 2014 at the Grosvenor House Hotel in London, England. During the ceremony, Empire presented Empire Awards in 14 categories as well as five honorary awards. The awards for Best Best Supporting Actor and Best Supporting Actress were first introduced this year. To celebrate the 25th anniversary of Empire magazine two special honorary awards were presented, the Action Hero of our Lifetime and the Legend of our Lifetime awards. Irish actor James Nesbitt hosted the show for the first time. The awards were sponsored by Jameson Irish Whiskey for the sixth consecutive year.

In related events, Empire and Jameson Irish Whiskey held the 5th Done In 60 Seconds Competition Global Final on March 29, 2014 at The Brewery, London, England. The team of judges consisted of Empire editor-in-chief Mark Dinning, Sky Movies Premiere English presenter Alex Zane, Scottish radio DJ Edith Bowman, Scottish director Jon S. Baird and English director Ben Wheatley, which selected from a shortlist of 24 nominees the five Done In 60 Seconds Award finalists that were invited to the Empire Awards where the winner was announced.

Gravity won two awards including Best Film and Best Director for Alfonso Cuarón. Other winners included The Hobbit: The Desolation of Smaug also with two awards and 12 Years a Slave, Alan Partridge: Alpha Papa, Blue Jasmine, Filth, Saving Mr. Banks, The Conjuring, The Hunger Games: Catching Fire, The Wolf of Wall Street and The World's End with one. Simon Pegg received the Empire Hero Award, Hugh Jackman received the Empire Icon Award, Paul Greengrass received the Empire Inspiration Award, Arnold Schwarzenegger received the special honorary 25th anniversary Action Hero of our Lifetime award and Tom Cruise received the special honorary 25th anniversary Legend of our Lifetime award. David Smith from the United Kingdom won the Done In 60 Seconds Award for There Will Be Blood (Milk), his 60-second film version of There Will Be Blood.

Winners and nominees
Winners are listed first and highlighted in boldface.

Multiple awards
The following two films received multiple awards:

Multiple nominations
The following 13 films received multiple nominations:

Done In 60 Seconds films

References

External links 

 
 

Empire Award ceremonies
2013 film awards
2014 in London
2014 in British cinema
March 2014 events in the United Kingdom
2010s in the City of Westminster